Joseph is a common male given name, derived from the Hebrew . "Joseph" is used, along with "Josef", mostly in English, French and partially German languages. This spelling is also found as a variant in the languages of the modern-day Nordic countries. In Portuguese and Spanish, the name is "José". In Arabic, including in the Quran, the name is spelled , .

The name has enjoyed significant popularity in its many forms in numerous countries, and Joseph was one of the two names, along with Robert, to have remained in the top 10 boys' names list in the US from 1925 to 1972. It is especially common in contemporary Israel, as either "Yossi" or "Yossef", and in Italy, where the name "Giuseppe" was the most common male name in the 20th century. In the first century CE, Joseph was the second most popular male name for Palestine Jews.

In the Book of Genesis Joseph is Jacob's eleventh son and Rachel's first son, and known in the Hebrew Bible as Yossef ben-Yaakov. In the New Testament the most notable two are Joseph, the husband of Mary, the mother of Jesus; and Joseph of Arimathea, a secret disciple of Jesus who supplied the tomb in which Jesus was buried.

Etymology
The Bible offers two explanations for the origins of the name Yosef: first, it is compared to the word  from the root /'sp/, : "And she conceived, and bore a son; and said, God hath taken away my reproach"; Yosef is then identified with the similar root /ysp/, meaning : "And she called his name Joseph; and said, The  shall add to me another son." The Jewish Encyclopedia says that it is a theophoric name referencing the Tetragrammaton.

Variants, diminutives and familiar forms in other languages

Variations for males include:
 Afrikaans: Josef, Joesoef
 Albanian: Jozë (indefinite), Joza (definite), Zef (indefinite), Zefi (definite), Josif (indefinite), Josifi (definite), Isuf (indefinite), Isufi (definite), Bibë (indefinite), Biba (definite)
 Alemmanic: Sepp, Seppu
 Alsatian: Sepp
 Amharic:  (Yosēfi)
 Aramaic:  (Yawsef, Yowsef)
 Armenian:  (Hovsep)
 Arabic:  (Yūsif, Youssef, Yussef, Yousif, Yousef, Youssof, Yūsuf)
 Arpitan: Dzozè 
 Azerbaijani: Yusif, Yusuf, Usub
 Basque: Joseba, Josepe
 Bavarian: Sepp, Bepperl, Beppe, Beppi,
 Belarusian:  (Iosif),  (Jazep)
 Bengali:  (Iusuf or Yusuf) (Islamic),  (Josef) (Christian)
 Bosnian: Josip, Jusuf
 Breton: Jozef, Jozeb
 Bulgarian:  (Yosif)
 Burmese (Myanmar):  (Yaw sautsai)
 Cantonese:  (Joek sat)
 Catalan: Josep, Pep (shortened form), Jep (an alternative shortened form)
 Circassian:  (Yusyf)
 Cornish: Josep
 Corsican: Ghjaseppu, Ghjiseppu
 Croatian: Josip, Joso, Jozo, Joza, Joze, Joško, Joža, Jože, Bepo, Bepi, Bapi,  Pino, Osíp, Bozo, Gonzo, Ganso
 Czech: Josef; Diminutives: Pepa, Peppa, Pepík, Pepik, Jožka, Pepan, Pepča, Pepek, Pepino, Jožin
 Danish: Josef
 Dutch: Jozef, Josephus; Diminutives: Joep, Joost, Jos, Jo, Jef, Seppe
 English: Joseph, Diminutives: Joe, Joey
 Esperanto: Jozefo
 Estonian: Joosep, Joosu
 Faroese: Jósef
 Fijian: Josefa
 Filipino: Joseph, José, Pepe, Peping, Sep, Jojo
 Finnish: Jooseppi, Juuso
 French: José, Joseph, Jojo
 Friulian: Josef, 'Sef, 'Sefin, 'Sefut, Bepi, Bepo, Beput
 Galician: Xosé
 Georgian:  (Ioseb),  (Soso)
 German: Josef, Joseph; Jupp (familiar); Sepp, Seppl or Pepi (familiar or diminutive forms, particularly in South Germany and Austria)
 Greek:  (Iosif),  (Iosipos),  (Sifis) (local in Crete)
 Gujarati:  (Jōsēfa)
 Hawaiian: Iokepa
 Hebrew:  (Yosef),  (Yossi) (diminutive)
 Hiligaynon: José, Josef, Josep (rare)
 Hindi:  (Yūsuf)
 Hungarian: József, Jóska, Józsi (diminutive)
 Icelandic: Jósef, Jói
 Igbo: Yôsēp̄, Yossef, Josef
 Indonesian: Yoseph, Yosep, Yusuf, Yosef, Yusup, Jusuf, Joesoef, Josef, Joseph
 Interlingua: Joseph
 Italian: Giuseppe, Giù, Beppe, Peppe, Peppino, Pepino, Pino, Bepi, Beppo, Pippo, Puccio, Gioseffo, Gio or Giò
 Irish: Seosamh, Iósaf
 Japanese:  (Yosefu),  (Josefu)
 Kambaata: Yeseffe, Yese, Josse, Jossy
 Kannada:  (Jōseph)
 Kazakh: Yusuf, Jusip
 Khmer:  (Yousaep)
 Korean:  (Yosep),  (Joseb)
 Kyrgyz:  (Jusup)
 Latin: Iōsēph, Iōsēphus
 Latvian: Jāzeps, Jozefs, Josefs, Josifs, Džozefs, Žozefs, Jusufs, Jozis, Zeps, Seps
 Limburgish: Joep, Sef
 Lithuanian: Juozapas, Juozas (shorter form), Juzas, Juzė (diminutive), Justas
 Lombard: Usèp, Jusèp, Bèp
 Macedonian:  (J̌osif)
 Malaysian: Yusuf, Yusop, Yusoff, Jusoh, Eusoff, Usop
 Manado Malay: Josef, Yosef, Oce'
 Maltese: Ġużeppi, Ġużi, Ġuż, Ġużè, Peppi, Peppu, Peppinu, Pepp, Peppa, Pepa, Żeppi, Żeppu, Żepp
 Marathi:  (Jōsēfa)
 Māori: Hohepa
 Mongolian:  (Iosyef)
 Nepali:  (Yūsupha)
 Norwegian: Josef
 Occitan: Josèp
 Persian:  (Youssef, Yūsuf, Yussef)
 Polish: Józef, Józek (diminutive), Józio (diminutive)
 Portuguese: José, Josefo; diminutive forms: Zé, Zeca, Zezé
 Provençal: Jóusè
 Punjabi:  (Yūsufa)
 Quechua: Husiy
 Romanian: Iosif, Iosub
 Romansch: Giusep, Gisep, Giusi, Sepp
 Russian:  (Iosif),  (Osip),  (Peppa)
 Samoan: Iosefa, Sefa
 Sardinian: Josepe, Zosepe, Gisepu
 Scottish Gaelic: Seòsaidh, Eòsaph, Iòsaph
 Serbian:  (Josif),  (Josef),  (Jozef)
 Sepedi: Josefa
 Sicilian: Giuseppi
 Silesian: Zefel, Zeflik (diminutive)
 Singapore: Joseph
 Sinhala:  (Juse),  (Jōsēf)
 Slovak: Jozef, Jožo, Dodo, Ďoďo, Dodô, Doido
 Slovene: Jožef, Jože
 Somali:  (Yuusuf)
 Spanish: José; hypocoristic versions: Pepe, Chepe, Che, Cheo, Chelo
 Sundanese: Yusup, Yosep
 Swahili: Yusuph, Yusufu, Yosefu 
 Swedish: Josef
 Sylheti:  (Yusuf)
 Syriac:  (Yosip, Yausef, Ossi)
 Tagalog: Jose, Pepe, Peping
 Tamil:  (sūsai),  (yōcēppu)
 Tajik:  (Yusuf)
 Telugu:  (Yōsepu)
 Thai:  (Co sef, Josef)
 Tongan: Siosefa
 Turkish: Yusuf
 Turkmen: Yusup
 Ukrainian:  (Josyp),  (Osyp)
  (Yūsuf)
 Uzbek: Yusuf
 Valencian: Josep
 Venetian: Juxepe, Bepi, Bepin, Bapi
 Vietnamese: Giu-se or Giô-xếp or Yuse or Giô-sép
 Vilamovian: Juza
 Welsh: Ioseff (or, less commonly, Iosep)
 Yiddish: Yissl, Yussel, Jayzl
 Yoruba: Josefu, Yusufu
 Shona: Joze, Joza
 Zulu: uJosef

Female forms

 Albanian: Jozefina, Zefina
 Catalan: Josepa, Pepa, Peppa (shortened)
 Cornish: Josepa
 Croatian: Josipa, Josica, Jozica
 Czech: Josefina, Josefa, Jozeva
 Dutch: José, Josefien
 English: Jo, Josephine, Joette, Posy, Posie
 French: Joséphine
 Friulian: Josefe, 'Sefe, Pine
 Greek:  (Iosiphina)
 Hungarian: Jozefa, Jozefina, Józsa
 Irish: Seosaimhín
 Italian: Giuseppa, Giuseppina
 Maltese: Ġuża, Ġużeppa
 Norwegian: Josefine, Josephine
 Polish: Józefina
 Portuguese: Josefa, Josefina, José (mainly in the compound Maria José), Zezé (nickname)
 Romansh: Giuseppa, Giuseppina
 Samoan: Iosefina
 Sardinian: Josepa, Zosepa, Zosepedda
 Slovak: Jozefína, Jozefa
 Spanish: Josefa, Josefina, Josefita
 Swedish: Josefin, Josefine, Josephine
 Yiddish: Jayzl, Yissl

People

Biblical figures
 Joseph (patriarch), son of Jacob in the Hebrew Bible book of Genesis
 Saint Joseph, husband of Mary, the mother of Jesus
 Joseph of Arimathea, secret disciple of Jesus
 Joseph Barsabbas, one of two candidates to replace Judas Iscariot's position among the Twelve Apostles
 Joseph ben Caiaphas, the Jewish high priest related to the crucifixion of Jesus. Only written as 'Caiaphas' in the New Testament.

Royalty
 Austria
 Joseph I, Holy Roman Emperor
 Joseph II of Austria
 Franz Joseph I of Austria
 Archduke Joseph August of Austria
 Archduke Joseph Ferdinand of Austria
 Portugal
 Joseph I of Portugal, King of Portugal
 Joseph, Prince of Brazil
 Joseph, General Inquisitor (1720–1801) – a natural son of King John V of Portugal, one of the Children of Palhavã.
 Spain/Italy/France
 Joseph Bonaparte, King of Spain, King of Naples
 Other
 Maximilian III Joseph, Elector of Bavaria
 Maximilian I Joseph of Bavaria, King of Bavaria
 Joseph (Khazar), king of the Khazars during the 950s and 960s
 Joseph Bonaparte, King of Naples and Spain

Politics
 Chief Joseph (1840–1904), Nez Perce tribal leader
 John Joseph Abercrombie (1798–1877), career United States Army officer and brigadier general 
 Joseph Arthur Ankrah (1915–1992), 2nd president of Ghana from 1966–1969
 Jusuf Anwar (1941–2015), Indonesian politician and diplomat
 Joseph Robinette "Joe" Biden (born 1942), 46th and current president of the United States (2021–present); 47th vice president of the United States (2009–2017); U.S. senator from Delaware (1973–2009)
 Joseph "Beau" Robinette Biden (1969–2015), American lawyer, soldier and politician, son of Joe Biden
 Joseph Carraro (born 1944), State Senator from New Mexico
 Joseph Caillaux, French politician and Minister of France
 Joseph Chamberlain (1836–1914), British statesman, diplomats, and businessman
 Joseph Cook (1860–1947), 6th Prime Minister of Australia
 Joseph Dudley, British military commander and colonial administrator, notable during colonization of Americas
 Joseph Estrada (born 1937), 13th president of the Philippines
 Joseph Isaac Gnanamuttu (died 1944), Sri Lankan Tamil politician
 Joseph Goebbels (1897–1945), German politician and propaganda minister of Nazi Germany
 Joseph Hemphill (1770-1842), U.S. Congressman
Joseph Coulon de Jumonville, French Canadian military officer
 Joseph Kabila, Congolese politician who served as President of the Democratic Republic of the Congo
 Joseph Kabui (1954–2008), first president of the Autonomous Region of Bougainville
 Jusuf Kalla (born 1942), 10th vice president of Indonesia (2004–2009); 12th vice president of Indonesia (2014–2019)
 Joseph P. Kennedy (1888–1969), American businessman, financier and politician
 Joseph P. Kennedy II (born 1952), oldest son of Senator and Attorney General Robert F. Kennedy and former Congressman from Massachusetts, 1987–1999
 Joe Kennedy (born 1980), son of Joseph P. Kennedy II and Congressman from Massachusetts, 2013–present
 Joe Kennedy (Georgia politician) (1930–1997), American politician from Georgia
 Joseph Abu Khalil (1925–2019), Lebanese politician and journalist
 Joe Lieberman (born 1942), US Senator from Connecticut
 Joseph Lyons (1879–1939), 10th Prime Minister of Australia
 Joseph de Maistre (1753–1821), French diplomat
 Joseph McCarthy (1908–1957), US Senator from Wisconsin
 Joseph Henry Mensah (1928–2018), Ghanaian economist and politician
 Joseph Bennet Odunton (1920–2004), Ghanaian civil servant
 Joseph Michael Perera (born 1941), Sri Lankan politician
 Joseph Yuvaraj Pillay (born 1934), Singaporean civil servant
 Sir Joseph Planta (1787–1847), English politician
 Joseph "Beppo" Schmid, Air force general in Nazi Germany 
 Joseph Hill Sinex (1819-1892), Pennsylvania State Representative
 Joseph Howland (1834–1886), American general, politician, and philanthropist
 Joseph Stalin (1878–1953), General Secretary of the Communist Party of the Soviet Union (1922–1953)
 Joseph Vidal (1933–2020), French politician
 Joseph Wapasha (c. 1816–1876), Mdewakanton Sioux chief

Arts and entertainment
 Joseph Albrier, French painter
 Joe Alwyn, British actor
 Joseph Barbera, American cartoonist
 Joseph Bertolozzi (born 1959), American composer
 Joseph Beuys, German artist
 Joseph Bitangcol, Filipino actor 
 Joseph Brodsky, Russian and American poet and essayist
 Harry Connick, Jr. (Joseph Harry Fowler Connick, Jr.), American singer, actor and pianist
 Joseph Connors, American art historian
 Joseph Conrad, Polish-British writer
 Joseph Cotten, American actor
 Joseph Dempsie, British actor
 Joseph Dennie, American writer
 Joe Dolan, Irish showband singer
 Joseph Garrett (born 1990), known online as stampylonghead, British YouTube personality
 Joseph Gordon-Levitt, American actor
 Joe Hawley, American singer, songwriter, and musician
 Joseph Hahn, American musician
 Joseph Haydn, Austrian composer
 Joseph Heller, American author
 Michael Joseph Jackson (1958–2009), American singer
 Joe Jonas, lead vocals, the Jonas Brothers
 Josef Jungmann, Czech poet and linguist
 Joseph Kaiser, Canadian opera singer
 Joseph Koo, Hong Kong composer and arranger
 Joseph L. Mankiewicz, American film director, producer and screenwriter
 Joseph May, British-born Canadian-American actor
 Joseph Mazzello, American actor
 Joe McElderry, British singer and winner of The X Factor
 Joseph Carey Merrick, the "Elephant Man"
 Joseph Peter Moraes Fernando, also known as Premnath Moraes (1923–1998), Sri Lankan Tamil actor, film director and screenwriter
 Joseph Nevels, also known as JSPH, singer/songwriter
 Joe Pasquale, winner of the 4th series of I'm a Celebrity... Get Me Out Of Here!
 Joe Pesci, American actor
 Joe Ranft, American screenwriter, animator, storyboard artist and voice actor
 Joe Root, English cricketer
 Joe Ruby (1933–2020), American cartoonist and producer
 Joe Strummer, English musician
 Joseph Pickett, American painter
 Joe Perry, Aerosmith lead guitarist
 Joe Sasto, American chef
 Joe Satriani, instrumental rock guitarist
 Joseph Simmons, aka DJ Run, of rap group Run-DMC
 Joseph Simmons (guitarist), American guitarist
 Joe Sugg, British YouTuber
 Joseph Tetsuro Bizinger, known online as The Anime Man, Japanese Australian YouTuber, voice actor, songwriter, and podcaster
 Joseph Vijay, Tamil actor
 Joss Whedon, American screenwriter, director and producer
 Joseph Wiseman (1918–2009), Canadian actor

Sports
 Joseph "Doc" Alexander, American NFL football player and coach
 Joseph Anoa'i, Samoan-American wrestler
 Joseph Charlton (born 1997), American football player
 Joe Choynski, American boxer
 Joe Clancy, American football player
 Joseph Daye, Australian footballer
 Joe DiMaggio, American baseball player
 Joe Frazier, American boxer
 Joe Garagiola, American baseball player and broadcaster
 Joe Gomez, English footballer
 Joseph Hagerty, American gymnast
 Joe Hart, English football player
 Joe Horlen, American baseball player
 Joe Jacobi, American canoer
 Joe Jacobson, Welsh soccer player
 Joe Kaminer, South African rugby player
 Joe Katchik, American football player
 Joe Keeble, American football player
 Joe Kehoskie (born 1973), American baseball executive
 Joe Lamas, American football player
 Joseph Louis Barrow, American boxer and heavyweight champion better known as "Joe Louis"
 Joe Magidsohn, Russian, American football player
 Joseph Marwa (boxer), Tanzanian boxer
 Joe Mauer, American baseball player
 Joe McGlone (1896–1963), American football player
 Joe Minucci (born 1981), American football player
 Joe Montana, American Hall of Fame NFL quarterback
 Joe Namath (born 1943), American Hall of Fame NFL quarterback
 Joseph Noteboom (born 1995), American football player
 Joseph Odom (born 1992), American professional baseball catcher
 Joe O'Malley, American football player
 Joseph Oosting, Dutch football player
 Joseph Paulo, New Zealand rugby player
 Joe Paterno, Penn State football coach
 Joe Pavelski (born 1984), American ice hockey player
 Joe Picker (born 1987), Australian rugby player
 Joe Prokop (born 1960), American football player
 Joe Prokop (halfback) (1921–1995), American football player
 Joe Righetti (born 1947), American football player
 Joe Schilling, American kick-boxer
 Joseph Schooling (born 1995), Singaporean swimmer
 Joe Stringfellow (1918–1992), American football player
Joseph Tapine (born 1994), New Zealand rugby league player
 Joseph Ualesi, Australian rugby player
 Joseph Valtellini (born 1985), Canadian kickboxer
 Joe Vetrano (1918–1995), American football player
 Joe Vodicka, American football player
 Joe Winkler (1922–2001), American football player
 Warnakulasuriya Patabendige Ushantha Joseph Chaminda Vaas (born 1974), Sri Lankan cricketer

Religion
 Joseph Ayo Babalola, Nigerian religious figure
 Joseph Gelfer, British researcher in religion and masculinities
 Joseph F. Merrill, American Latter-day Saint apostle
 Joseph (Petrovykh) (1872–1937), metropolitan of the Russian Orthodox Church
 Joseph Ponniah, 1st Bishop of the Roman Catholic Diocese of Batticaloa
 Joseph Prince, a pastor and IT consultant
 Joseph Ratzinger, given name of Pope Benedict XVI
 Joseph Sarvananthan, Sri Lankan Tamil Anglican priest
 Joseph Smith, founder of the Latter Day Saint movement
 Joseph Smith III, son of Joseph Smith and founder of the Reorganized Church of Jesus Christ of Latter Day Saints
 Joseph F. Smith, 6th president of The Church of Jesus Christ of Latter-day Saints
 Joseph Fielding Smith, 10th president of The Church of Jesus Christ of Latter-day Saints
 Joseph of Vatopedi (1921–2009), Greek Cypriot Orthodox monk
 Joseph Vaz, Indian Catholic priest, "Apostle of Sri Lanka"
 Joseph B. Wirthlin, American Latter-day Saint apostle
 Joseph Angell Young, American Latter-day Saint apostle
 Rayappu Joseph, 2nd Bishop of Mannar

Scholars
 Joseph von Baader (1763–1835), German engineer and rail transport pioneer
 Josef Dobrovský, Czech philologist and historian
 Joseph W. Esherick, American historian of China
 Joseph Peter de Fonseka (1897–1948), Sri Lankan essayist and editor
 Joseph Dalton Hooker, British botanist
 Joseph de Maistre (1753–1821), French philosopher
 Joseph Mercado, Filipino statistician
 Joseph S. Murphy (1933–1998), American political scientist and university administrator
 Joseph Planta (1744–1828), Swiss principal librarian of the British Museum
 Joe Root, a 19th-century American naturalist from Erie, Pennsylvania
 Joseph Polchinski, theoretical physicist and string theorist

Inventors
 Joseph Glidden (1813–1906), inventor of barbed wire
 Joseph Nicéphore Niépce (1765–1833), first person to create a permanent photograph

Crime
 Joseph D. "Joe" Ball (1896–1938), American murderer and suspected serial killer
 Joseph Christopher (1955–1993), American serial killer
 Joseph James DeAngelo (born 1945), American serial killer and rapist and former cop
 Joseph Edward Duncan (1963–2021), American serial killer, rapist, and kidnapper
 Joseph Paul Franklin (1950–2013), American serial killer, arsonist, bank robber, and neo-nazi
 Joseph Kallinger (1935–1996), American serial killer and rapist
 Joseph Massino (born 1943), former boss of Bonanno crime family
 Joseph Mengele (1911–1979), Nazi scientist
 Joseph Scott Pemberton, a US Marine lance corporal convicted of the homicide of Jennifer Laude, a Filipino trans woman
 Joseph Rosenzweig, (c.1891–?), American New York City labor racketeer 
 Joseph Skowron (born c.1969), American portfolio manager convicted of insider trading

Other
 Joseph Fenton, informer killed by the Provisional Irish Republican Army
 Joseph Fitzgerald (disambiguation), multiple people
 Joseph Hedley, English quilter and murder victim
 Joseph B. MacInnis (born 1937), Canadian physician, underwater diver and author
 Joseph Oliver (disambiguation), multiple people
 Joseph Safra (1938–2020), Brazilian banker
 Joseph Thornton (1808–1891), English bookseller based in Oxford
 Joseph Wilf (1925–2016), Polish-born American businessman

Fictional characters
 Joseph Desaulniers, a hunter in the video game Identity V
 Joseph Goldberg, main character in the Netflix series You
 Joseph Joestar (ジョセフ・ジョースター), the main protagonist of Battle Tendency in the manga series JoJo's Bizarre Adventure
 Joseph Seed, a recurring character in the Far Cry video game franchise
 Joseph Wilford, the main antagonist in the Netflix series Snowpiercer

See also
 Hohepa (disambiguation)
 Joe (disambiguation)
 Josef (disambiguation)
 Jozef
 József
 Saint Joseph (disambiguation)
 Yosef (disambiguation), a variation of the name in Hebrew, and the Dutch eye dialect of the name
 Yusuf (disambiguation), as rendered in Islam/Arabic

References

English-language masculine given names
English masculine given names
German masculine given names
Hebrew masculine given names
Modern names of Hebrew origin